The Siva is a river in Udmurt Republic and Perm Krai in Russia, a :wikt:right bank:right tributary of the Kama. It starts in the Chastinsky District, near the village of Pikhtovka. Then it flows through the Bolshesosnovsky District of Perm Krai and the Votkinsky District of Udmurtia. Its mouth is downstream of the dam of Votkinsk Hydroelectric Station. 
The Siva freezes up in the second half of October and remains icebound until April. 

Main tributaries:
Left: only small insignificant rivers; 
Right: But, Sosnovka, Chyornaya, Lyp, Votka.

References 

Siva in Great Soviet Encyclopedia

Rivers of Udmurtia
Rivers of Perm Krai